United with Labour was Scottish Labour's campaign for a No vote in the 2014 referendum on Scottish independence. It was launched in May 2013 by Johann Lamont, Anas Sarwar, and Gordon Brown, MP for Kirkcaldy and Cowdenbeath. It was intended that the campaign would involve "roadshows across Scotland", with at least one being attended by Ed Miliband. Unlike Labour for Independence, the Labour campaign for a Yes vote, United with Labour did not have a website other than that of the Scottish Labour Party.

Labour also held the chair of cross-party campaign Better Together, with a further 2 senior Labour MSPs sitting on the board.

See also
 Better Together
 Yes Scotland
 Labour for Independence
 Unionism in Scotland

References

2013 establishments in Scotland
2013 in British politics
Organizations established in 2013
Scottish Labour
Political campaigns in the United Kingdom
Unionism in Scotland
2014 Scottish independence referendum